Yemenite Jews or Yemeni Jews or Teimanim (from  Yehudei Teman) are those Jews who live, or once lived, in Yemen, and their descendants maintaining their customs. Between June 1949 and September 1950, the overwhelming majority of Yemen's Jewish population immigrated to Israel in Operation Magic Carpet. After several waves of persecution throughout Yemen, the vast majority of Yemenite Jews now live in Israel, while smaller communities live in the United States and elsewhere. Only a handful remain in Yemen. The few remaining Jews experience intense, and at times violent, anti-Semitism on a daily basis. 

Yemenite Jews observe a unique religious tradition that distinguishes them from Ashkenazi Jews, Sephardi Jews, and other Jewish groups. They have been described as "the most Jewish of all Jews" and "the ones who have preserved the Hebrew language the best". Yemenite Jews fall within the "Mizrahi" (eastern) category of Jews, though they differ from other Mizrahi Jews who have undergone a process of total or partial assimilation to Sephardic liturgy and custom. While the Shami sub-group of Yemenite Jews did adopt a Sephardic-influenced rite, this was mostly due to it being forced upon them, and did not reflect a demographic or general cultural shift among the vast majority of Yemenite Jews.

Family pedigrees
Some Jewish families have preserved traditions which are related to their tribal affiliations, based on partial genealogical records which have been passed down from generation to generation. In Yemen, for example, some Jews trace their lineage to Judah, others trace their lineage to Benjamin, and others trace their lineage to Levi and Reuben. Of particular interest is one distinguished Jewish family of Yemen which traced its lineage to Bani, one of the sons of Peretz, the son of Judah.

Early history

There are numerous accounts and traditions concerning the arrival of Jews in various regions in Southern Arabia. One tradition suggests that King Solomon sent Jewish merchant marines to Yemen to prospect for gold and silver with which to adorn his Temple in Jerusalem. In 1881, the French vice consulate in Yemen wrote to the leaders of the Alliance (the Alliance Israelite Universelle) in France, that he read in a book by the Arab historian Abu-Alfada that the Jews of Yemen settled in the area in 1451 BCE. Another legend says that Yemeni tribes converted to Judaism after the Queen of Sheba's visit to King Solomon. The Sanaite Jews have a tradition that their ancestors settled in Yemen forty-two years before the destruction of the First Temple. It is said that under the prophet Jeremiah some 75,000 Jews, including priests and Levites, traveled to Yemen. Another legend states that when Ezra commanded the Jews to return to Jerusalem they disobeyed, whereupon he pronounced a ban upon them. According to this legend, as a punishment for this hasty action, Ezra was denied burial in Israel. As a result of this local tradition, which cannot be validated historically, it is said that no Jew of Yemen gives the name of Ezra to a child, although all other Biblical appellatives are used. The Yemenite Jews claim that Ezra cursed them to be a poor people for not heeding his call. This seems to have come true in the eyes of some Yemenites, as Yemen is extremely poor. However, some Yemenite sages in Israel today emphatically reject this story as myth, if not outright blasphemy.

Because of Yemenite Jewry's cultural affiliation with Babylon, historian Yehuda Ratzaby opines that the Jews of Yemen migrated to Yemen from places in Babylonia. Archaeological records referring to Judaism in Yemen started to appear during the rule of the Himyarite Kingdom, established in Yemen in 110 BCE. Various inscription in Musnad script in the second century CE refer to constructions of synagogues approved by Himyarite Kings. In the aftermath of the Bar-Kokhba revolt, there was significant Jewish emigration from Judea to Yemen, which was then famous in the Greco-Roman world for its prosperous trade, particularly in spices. According to local legends, the kingdom's aristocracy converted to Judaism in the 6th century CE. The Christian missionary, Theophilos, who came to Yemen in the mid-fourth century, complained that he had found great numbers of Jews. By 380 CE, Himyarites religious practices had undergone fundamental changes. The inscriptions were no longer addressed to El Maqah or 'Athtar, but to a single deity called Rahman. Debate among scholars continues as to whether the Himyarite monotheism was influenced by Judaism or Christianity. Jews became especially numerous and powerful in the southern part of Arabia, a rich and fertile land of incense and spices and a way station on the routes to Africa, India, and East Asia. The Yemeni tribes did not oppose Jewish presence in their country. By 516, tribal unrest broke out, and several tribal elites fought for power. One of those elites was Joseph Dhu Nuwas or "Yûsuf 'As'ar Yaṯ'ar" as mentioned in ancient south Arabian inscriptions. The actual story of Joseph is murky. Greek and Ethiopian accounts, portray him as a Jewish zealot. Some scholars suggest that he was a converted Jew. Nestorian accounts claim that his mother was a Jew taken captive from Nisibis and bought by a king in Yemen, whose ancestors had formerly converted to Judaism. Syriac and Byzantine sources maintain that Yûsuf ’As’ar sought to convert other Yemeni Christians, but they refused to renounce Christianity. The actual picture, however, remains unclear.

Some scholars believe that Syriac sources reflected a great deal of hatred toward Jews. In 2009 a BBC broadcast defended a claim that Yûsuf ’As’ar offered villagers the choice between conversion to Judaism or death and then massacred 20,000 Christians. The program's producers stated that, "The production team spoke to many historians over 18 months, among them Nigel Groom, who was our consultant, and Professor Abdul Rahman Al-Ansary [former professor of archaeology at the King Saud University in Riyadh]." Inscriptions attributed to Yûsuf ’As’ar himself show the great pride he expressed after killing more than 22,000 Christians in Ẓafār and Najran. According to Jamme, Sabaean inscriptions reveal that the combined war booty (excluding deaths) from campaigns waged against the Abyssinians in Ẓafār, the fighters in ’Ašʻarān, Rakbān, Farasān, Muḥwān (Mocha), and the fighters and military units in Najran, amounted to 12,500 war trophies, 11,000 captives and 290,000 camels and bovines and sheep.

Historian Glen Bowersock described this as a "savage pogrom that the Jewish king of the Arabs launched against the Christians in the city of Najran. The king himself reported in excruciating detail to his Arab and Persian allies about the massacres he had inflicted on all Christians who refused to convert to Judaism." There were also reports of massacres and destruction of places of worship by Christians too. Francis Edward Peters wrote that while there is no doubt that this was a religious persecution, it is equally clear that a political struggle was going on as well. It is likely that Dhu Nuwas was a leader of a liberation movement seeking to free Yemen from an increasing foreign meddling in the nation's affairs, and Judaism became a vital element in the resistance.

According to ‘Irfan Shahid's Martyrs of Najran – New Documents, Dhu-Nuwas sent an army of some 120,000 soldiers to lay siege to the city of Najran, which siege lasted for six months, and the city taken and burnt on the 15th day of the seventh month (i.e. the lunar month Tishri). The city had revolted against the king and they refused to deliver it up unto the king. About three hundred of the city's inhabitants surrendered to the king's forces, under the assurances of an oath that no harm would come to them, and these were later bound, while those remaining in the city were burnt alive within their church. The death toll in this account is said to have reached about two thousand. However, in the Sabaean inscriptions describing these events, it is reported that by the month Dhu-Madra'an (between July and September) there were “1000 killed, 1500 prisoners [taken] and 10,000 head of cattle.”

There are two dates mentioned in the “letter of Simeon of Beit Aršam.” One date indicates the letter was written in Tammuz in the year 830 of Alexander (518/519 CE), from the camp of GBALA (Jebala), king of the ‘SNYA (Ghassanids or the Ġassān clan). In it, he tells of the events that transpired in Najran, while the other date puts the letter's composition in the year 835 of Alexander (523/524 CE). The second letter, however, is actually a Syriac copy of the original, copied in the year 1490 of the Seleucid Era (= 1178/79 CE). Today, it is largely agreed that the latter date is the accurate one, as it is confirmed by the Martyrium Arethae, as well as by epigraphic records, namely Sabaean inscriptions discovered in the Asir of Saudi-Arabia (Bi’r Ḥimâ), photographed by J. Ryckmans in Ry 507, 8 ~ 9, and by A. Jamme in Ja 1028, which give the old Sabaean year 633 for these operations (said to correspond with 523 CE).

Jacques Ryckmans, who deciphered these inscriptions, writes in his La Persécution des Chrétiens Himyarites, that Sarah'il Yaqbul-Yaz'an was both the tribal chief and the lieutenant of Yûsuf ’As’ar (the king) at the time of the military campaign, and that he was sent out by the king to take the city of Najran, while the king watched for a possible Abyssinian/Ethiopian incursion along the coastal plains of Yemen near Mokhā (al-Moḫâ) and the strait known as Bāb al-Mandab. The Ethiopian church in Ẓafâr, which had been built by the king of Yemen some years earlier, and another church built by him in Aden (see: Ecclesiastical History of Philostorgius, Epitome of Book III, chapter 4), had been seen by Constantius II during the embassage to the land of the Ḥimyarites (i.e. Yemen) in circa 340 CE. By the 6th-century CE, this church was set on fire and razed to the ground, and its Abyssinian inhabitants killed. Later, foreigners (presumably Christians) living in Haḏramawt were also put to death before the king's army advanced to Najran in the far north and took it.

Byzantine emperor Justin I sent a fleet to Yemen and Joseph Dhu Nuwas was killed in battle in 525 CE. The persecutions ceased, and the western coasts of Yemen became a tributary state until Himyarite nobility (also Jews) managed to regain power.

There are also several historical works which suggest that a Jewish kingdom existed in Yemen during pre-Islamic late antiquity. In Yemen, several inscriptions dating back to the 4th and 5th centuries CE have been found in Hebrew and Sabaean praising the ruling house in Jewish terms for "helping and empowering the People of Israel". Yet, even here, part of the inscription was embedded in the ground belonging to the mosque. The inscription is believed to date back to the 4th century CE, and attests to the antiquity of the Jews in that area. To that same period belongs another bilingual Sabaean-Hebrew inscription, which orientalist Giovānnī Garbinī of Naples discovered in 1970. The inscription is found on a column in Bayt al-Ašwāl near Ẓafār [Dhofār] (c. 17 km. from the town of Yarim) and shows, interposed on an earlier writing, the words, "The writing of Judah, of blessed memory, Amen shalom amen," engraved in antiquated Assyrian (Hebrew) script in between larger, sculpted Sabaean script. The inscription is thought to date back to either the 4th or 5th-century CE.

Jewish–Muslim relations in Yemen

Middle Ages
As Ahl al-Kitab (lit. "The People of the Scriptures"), Jews were assured freedom of religion only in exchange for payment of a poll-tax (Arabic: jizya), imposed on certain non-Muslim monotheists (people of the Book). Feudal overlords imposed the annual poll-tax upon Jews, which, under Islamic law, was to ensure their status as protected persons of the state. This tax (tribute) was assessed against every male thirteen years and older, and its remittance varied between the wealthy and the poor. In the early 20th century, this amounted to one Maria Theresa thaler (riyal) for a poor man, two thalers in specie for the middle classes, and four or more thalers for the rich. Upon payment, Jews were also exempt from paying the zakat which must be paid by Muslims once their residual wealth reaches a certain threshold. Active persecution of Jews did not gain full force until the Zaydi clan seized power, from the more tolerant Sunni Muslims, early in the 10th century. The legal status of Jews in Yemen started to deteriorate around the time the Tahirids took Sana'a from Zaidis, mainly because of new discriminations established by the Muslim rulers. Such laws were not included in Zaidi legal writings till comparatively late with Kitab al-Azhar of Imam al-Murtada in the first half of the 15th century. This also led to deterioration of economic and social situation of Jews.

Jewish intellectuals wrote in both Hebrew and Arabic and engaged in the same literary endeavours as the Muslim majority. According to a late 9th century document, the first Zaydi imam al-Hadi had imposed limitations and a special tax on land held by Jews and Christians of Najran. In the mid-11th century, Jews from a number of communities in Yemen highlands including Sana'a appear to have been attracted to Sulayhids' capital of Dhu Jibla. The city was founded by Abdullah bin Muhammad al-Sulaihi in the mid-11th century and according to Tarikh al-Yamman of the famed Yemenite author Umara al-Yamani (1121–74), was named after a Jewish pottery merchant.

During the 12th century, Aden was first ruled by Fatimids and then Ayyubids. The city formed a great emporium on the sea route to India. Documents of the Cairo Geniza pertaining to Aden reflect a thriving Jewish community led by the prominent Bundar family. Abu Ali Hasan ibn Bundar (Heb. Japheth) served as the head of the Jewish communities in Yemen as well as a representative of the merchants in Aden. His son Madmun was the central figure in Yemenite Jewry during the flourishing of trade with India. The Bundar family produced some celebrated negidim who exerted authorities over Jews of Yemen as well as Jewish merchants in India and Ceylon. The community developed communal and spiritual connection in addition to business and family ties with other Jewish communities in the Islamic world. They also developed ties with and funded Jewish centers and academies of Babylon, Palestine and Egypt. Due to the trade, Jews also emigrated to Aden for mercantile and personal reasons.

Yemenite Jews also experienced violent persecution at times. In the late 1160s, the Yemenite ruler 'Abd-al-Nabī ibn Mahdi gave Jews a choice of conversion to Islam or martyrdom. Mahdi also imposed his beliefs upon the Muslims besides the Jews. This led to a revival of Jewish messianism, but also led to mass-conversion. While a popular local Yemenite Jewish preacher called on Jews to choose martyrdom, Maimonides sent what is known by the name Iggeret Teman ("Epistle to Yemen"), requesting that they remain faithful to their religion, but if at all possible, not to cast affronts before their antagonists. The persecution ended in 1173 with the defeat of Ibn Mahdi and conquest of Yemen by Turan-Shah, the brother of Saladin, and they were allowed to return to their faith. According to two Genizah documents, the Ayyubid ruler of Yemen, al-Malik al-Mu'izz al-Ismail (reigned 1197—1202) attempted to force the Jews of Aden to convert. The second document details the relief of Jewish community after his murder and those who had been forced to convert reverted to Judaism.

The rule of Shafi'i Rasulids which lasted from 1229 to 1474 brought stability to the region. During this period, Jews enjoyed social and economic prosperity. This changed with the rise of the Tahiri dynasty that ruled until the conquest by the Ottoman Empire of Yemen in 1517. A note written in a Jewish manuscript mentions the destruction of the old synagogue in Sana'a in 1457 under the rule of the dynasty's founder Ahmad 'Amir. An important note of the treatment of Jews by Tahirids is found in the colophon of a Jewish manuscript from Yemen in 1505, when the last Tahirid Sultan took Sana'a from the Zaydis. The document describes one kingdom as exploitive and the other as repressive.

The Jewish communities experienced a messianic episode with the rise of another Messiah claimant in Bayhan District, mentioned by Hayim bin Yahya Habhush in History of the Jews in Yemen written in 1893 and Ba'faqia al-Shihri's Chronicle written in the 16th century. The messiah was acknowledged as a political figure and gathered many people around him into what seemed to be an organized military force. The Tahirid Sultan Amir ibn 'Abd al-Wahhab attacked the messiah, killing many Jews and crushing the movement. He saw it as a violation of the protection agreement and liquidated the Jewish settlement in Hadhramaut as collective punishment. Presumably some of them were killed, many converted to Islam or migrated to Aden and the adjacent mainland of Yemen. It seems, however, the liquidation wasn't immediate. Jews of the place are recorded by 1527, but not by the 1660s. After the 15th century, Jewish communities only existed in Hadhramaut's western periphery. The oppression at the hands of pious Muslim rulers and endangerment of the community because of the plots of a few Jewish messianists, are common themes in the history of Yemenite Jews. The Ottoman conquest allowed Yemenite Jews a chance to have contact with other Jewish communities; contact was established with the Kabbalists in Safed, a major Jewish center, as well as with Jewish communities throughout the Ottoman Empire.

Maimonides
Moses Maimonides (1138–1204), the 12th-century philosopher, scholar and codifier of Jewish law, was greatly endeared by the Jews of Yemen for his having intervened on their behalf during a time of religious persecution, heresy and heavy taxes levied on the community. When the writings of Maimonides reached the heads of the community, they continued to address their questions unto him and sent emissaries to purchase several copies of his books, just as he, himself, acknowledged. In all the subjects of the Torah, Yemenite Jews customarily base their rule of practice (halakhah) on Maimonides' teachings, and will instruct in accordance with his view, whether in lenient rulings or in strict rulings, even where most other halakhic authorities disagree. Even so, some ancient customs remained with the Yemenite Jews, especially in those matters committed unto the masses and to the general public, which are still adhered to by them from an ancient period, and which they did not change even though Maimonides rules otherwise. In common Jewish practice, the Jews of Yemen dissented with Maimonides' rulings in more than 50 places, ten of which places are named explicitly by Rabbi Yosef Qafih.

Early modern period

The Zaydi enforced a statute known as the Orphan's Decree, anchored in their own 18th-century legal interpretations and enforced at the end of that century. It obligated the Zaydi state to take under its protection and to educate in Islamic ways any dhimmi (i.e. non-Muslim) child whose parents had died when he was a minor. The Orphan's Decree was ignored during the Ottoman rule (1872–1918), but was renewed during the period of Imam Yahya (1918–1948).

Under the Zaydi rule, the Jews were considered to be impure and therefore forbidden to touch a Muslim or a Muslim's food. They were obligated to humble themselves before a Muslim, to walk to the left side, and greet him first. They could not build houses higher than a Muslim's or ride a camel or horse, and when riding on a mule or a donkey, they had to sit sideways. Upon entering the Muslim quarter a Jew had to take off his foot-gear and walk barefoot. If attacked with stones or fists by youth, a Jew was not allowed to fight them. In such situations, he had the option of fleeing or seeking intervention by a merciful Muslim passerby.

Ottoman rule ended in 1630, when the Zaydis took over Yemen. Jews were once again persecuted. In 1679, under the rule of Al-Mahdi Ahmad, Jews were expelled en masse from all parts of Yemen to the distant province of Mawza, and many Jews died there of starvation and disease as consequence. As many as two-thirds of the exiled Jews did not survive. Their houses and property were seized, and many synagogues were destroyed or converted into mosques. This event was later known as the Mawza exile, and it is recalled in many writings of the Yemenite Jewish rabbi and poet Shalom Shabazi, who experienced it himself. About a year after the expulsion, the survivors were allowed to return for economic reasons; Jews were the majority of craftsmen and artisans, and thus a vital asset in the country's economy. However, they were not allowed to return to their former homes, and found that most of their religious articles had been destroyed. They were instead resettled in special Jewish quarters outside the cities.

The Jewish community recovered partly because of Imam Muhammad al-Mahdi, also called "Sahib al-Mawahib", who protected them and allowed them to return to their previous status. He rejected the pleas for Jewish deportation by the clerics and maintained ties with the Jewish 'Iraqi family which was charged with the mint house. From the end of the 17th century, the Jews ran the mint house of the imams. In 1725, Imam Al-Mutawakkil ordered closure of synagogues because of the Jews selling wine to Muslims. However, their closure was rejected by a religious legal ruling that these synagogues were permitted by his predecessors.

The Jews of Yemen had expertise in a wide range of trades normally avoided by Zaydi Muslims. Trades such as silver-smithing, blacksmiths, repairing weapons and tools, weaving, pottery, masonry, carpentry, shoemaking, and tailoring were occupations that were exclusively taken by Jews. The division of labor created a sort of covenant, based on mutual economic and social dependency, between the Zaydi Muslim population and the Jews of Yemen. The Muslims produced and supplied food, and the Jews supplied all manufactured products and services that the Yemeni farmers needed.

The Jewish community headed by Shalom 'Iraqi recovered from this affair and the position of 'Iraqi strengthened under Imam Al-Mansur. The community flourished under him because of the part it played in trade with India through Mocha. The German researcher Carsten Niebuhr who visited Yemen in 1763, reports that two years before he arrived, Shalom 'Iraqi had been imprisoned and fined while twelve out of fourteen synagogues in a village near Sana'a were shut down. 'Iraqi was released two weeks before his arrival. Jewish sources attribute this to a regime change. The Imam Al-Mahdi Abbas was extremely religious and his ideological affinity with the clerics created an atmosphere of extreme repression. He however resisted their pressure on him to expel the Jews. The synagogues were reopened by Ali al-Mansur after payment of a heavy fee.

During the 18th century, Yemenite Jews gained a brief respite from their status as second-class citizens when the Imamics came to power. Yemen experienced a resurgence of Jewish life. Synagogues were rebuilt, and some Jews achieved high office. One of them was Rabbi Shalom ben Aharon, who became responsible for minting and for the royal coffers. When the Imamics lost power in the 19th century, Jews were again subjected to persecution. In 1872, the Ottoman Empire again took over, and Ottoman rule would last until Yemeni independence in 1918. Jewish life again improved during Ottoman rule; Jewish freedom of religion was more widely respected, and Yemenite Jews were permitted to have more contact with other Jewish communities.

Chronology of events

Places of Settlement in Yemen

At the beginning of the nineteenth-century, Yemenite Jews lived principally in Sana'a (7,000 +), with the largest Jewish population and twenty-eight synagogues, followed by Rada'a, with the second largest Jewish population and nine synagogues, Sa'dah (1,000), Dhamar (1,000), Aden (200), the desert of Beda (2,000), Manakhah (3,000), among others. Almost all resided in the interior of the plateau. Carl Rathjens who visited Yemen in the years 1927 and 1931 puts the total number of Jewish communities in Yemen at 371 settlements. Other significant Jewish communities in Yemen were based in the south central highlands in the cities of: Taiz (the birthplace of one of the most famous Yemenite Jewish spiritual leaders, Mori Salem Al-Shabazzi Mashta), Ba'dan, and other cities and towns in the Shar'ab region. Many other Jewish communities in Yemen were long since abandoned by their Jewish inhabitants. Yemenite Jews were chiefly artisans, including gold-, silver- and blacksmiths in the San'a area, and coffee merchants in the south central highland areas.

19th-century Yemenite messianic movements

During this period messianic expectations were very intense among the Jews of Yemen (and among many Arabs as well). The three pseudo-messiahs of this period, and their years of activity, are:
 Shukr Kuhayl I (1861–65)
 Shukr Kuhayl II (1868–75)
 Joseph Abdallah (1888–93)
According to the Jewish traveler Jacob Saphir, the majority of Yemenite Jews during his visit of 1862 entertained a belief in the messianic proclamations of Shukr Kuhayl I. Earlier Yemenite messiah claimants included the anonymous 12th-century messiah who was the subject of Maimonides' famous Iggeret Teman, or Epistle to Yemen, the messiah of Bayhan (c. 1495), and Suleiman Jamal (c. 1667), in what Lenowitz regards as a unified messiah history spanning 600 years.

Religious traditions

Yemenite Jews and the Aramaic speaking Kurdish Jews are the only communities who maintain the tradition of reading the Torah in the synagogue in both Hebrew and the Aramaic Targum ("translation"). Most non-Yemenite synagogues have a specified person called a Baal Koreh, who reads from the Torah scroll when congregants are called to the Torah scroll for an aliyah. In the Yemenite tradition, each person called to the Torah scroll for an aliyah reads for himself. Children under the age of Bar Mitzvah are often given the sixth aliyah. Each verse of the Torah read in Hebrew is followed by the Aramaic translation, usually chanted by a child. Both the sixth aliyah and the Targum have a simplified melody, distinct from the general Torah melody used for the other aliyot.

Like most other Jewish communities, Yemenite Jews chant different melodies for Torah, Prophets (Haftara), Megillat Aicha (Book of Lamentations), Kohelet (Ecclesiastes, read during Sukkot), and Megillat Esther (the Scroll of Esther read on Purim). Unlike Ashkenazic communities, there are melodies for Mishle (Proverbs) and Psalms.

In larger Jewish communities, such as Sana'a and Sad'a, boys were sent to the melamed at the age of three to begin their religious learning. They attended the melamed from early dawn to sunset on Sunday through Thursday and until noon on Friday. Jewish women were required to have a thorough knowledge of the laws pertaining to Kashrut and Taharat Mishpachah (family purity) i.e. Niddah. Some women even mastered the laws of Shechita, thereby acting as ritual slaughterers.

People also sat on the floors of synagogues instead of sitting on chairs, similar to the way many other non-Ashkenazi Jews sat in synagogues. This is in accordance with what Rambam (Maimonides) wrote in his Mishneh Torah:

The lack of chairs may also have been to provide more space for prostration, another ancient Jewish observance that the Jews of Yemen continued to practise until very recent times. There are still a few Yemenite Jews who prostrate themselves during the part of everyday Jewish prayer called Tachanun (Supplication), though such individuals usually do so in privacy. In the small Jewish community that exists today in Bet Harash, prostration is still done during the tachanun prayer. Jews of European origin generally prostrate only during certain portions of special prayers during Rosh Hashanah (Jewish New Year) and Yom Kippur (Day of Atonement). Prostration was a common practise amongst all Jews until some point during the late Middle Ages or Renaissance period.

Like Yemenite Jewish homes, the synagogues in Yemen had to be lower in height than the lowest mosque in the area. In order to accommodate this, synagogues were built into the ground to give them more space without looking large from the outside. In some parts of Yemen, minyanim would often just meet in homes of Jews, instead of the community having a separate building for a synagogue. Beauty and artwork were saved for the ritual objects in the synagogue and in the home.

Yemenite Jews also wore a distinctive tallit often found to this day. The Yemenite tallit features a wide atara and large corner patches, embellished with silver or gold thread, and the fringes along the sides of the tallit are netted. According to the Baladi custom, the tzitzit are tied with seven chulyot (hitches), based on Maimonides' teaching.

On Sabbath days, the traditional Yemenite bread was not the Challah, as found in Western Jewish communities, but the Kubaneh, which was eaten on Sabbath mornings after first making the blessing over two flatbreads baked in an earthen oven.

Weddings and marriage traditions

During a Yemenite Jewish wedding, the bride was bedecked with jewelry and wore a traditional wedding costume, including an elaborate headdress decorated with flowers and rue leaves, which were believed to ward off evil. Gold threads were woven into the fabric of her clothing. Songs were sung as part of a seven-day wedding celebration, with lyrics about friendship and love in alternating verses of Hebrew and Arabic.

In Yemen, the Jewish practice was not for the groom and his bride to be secluded in a canopy (chuppah) hung on four poles, as is widely practiced today in Jewish weddings, but rather in a bridal chamber that was, in effect, a highly decorated room in the house of the groom. This room was traditionally decorated with large hanging sheets of colored, patterned cloth, replete with wall cushions and short-length mattresses for reclining. Their marriage is consummated when they have been left together alone in this room. This ancient practice finds expression in the writings of Isaac ben Abba Mari (c. 1122 – c. 1193), author of Sefer ha-'Ittur, concerning the Benediction of the Bridegroom: "Now the chuppah is when her father delivers her unto her husband, bringing her into that house wherein is some new innovation, such as the sheets… surrounding the walls, etc. For we recite in the Jerusalem Talmud, Sotah 46a (Sotah 9:15), 'Those bridal chambers, (chuppoth hathanim), they hang within them patterned sheets and gold-embroidered ribbons,' etc."

After immigration to Israel, the regional varieties of Yemenite bridal jewelry were replaced by a uniform item that became identified with the community: the splendid bridal garb of Sana'a.

Before the wedding, Yemenite and other Eastern Jewish communities perform the henna ceremony, an ancient ritual with Bronze Age origins. The family of the bride mixes a paste derived from the henna plant that is placed on the palms of the bride and groom, and their guests. After the paste is washed off, a deep orange stain remains that gradually fades over the next week.

Yemenites had a special affinity for Henna due to biblical and Talmudic references. Henna, in the Bible, is Camphire, and is mentioned in the Song of Solomon, as well as in the Talmud. This tradition is also practiced by Pashtuns and Afghan Jews.

"My Beloved is unto me as a cluster of Camphire in the vineyards of En-Gedi" Song of Solomon, 1:14

A Yemenite Jewish wedding custom specific only to the community of Aden is the Talbis, revolving around the groom. A number of special songs are sung by the men while holding candles, and the groom is dressed in a golden garment.

Religious groups

The three main groups of Yemenite Jews are the Baladi, Shami, and the Maimonideans or "Rambamists". In addition, the "Rechabites" are a tribe in Sana'a claiming to be descendants of Jehonadab that was found in 1839 by Reverend Joseph Wolff, who later went to Bukhara to attempt to save Lieutenant Colonel Charles Stoddart and Captain Arthur Conolly.

The differences between these groups largely concern the respective influence of the original Yemenite tradition, which was largely based on the works of Maimonides, and on the Kabbalistic tradition embodied in the Zohar and in the school of Isaac Luria, which was increasingly influential from the 17th century on.
 The Baladi Jews (from Arabic balad, country) generally follow the legal rulings of the Rambam (Maimonides) as codified in his work the Mishneh Torah. Their liturgy was developed by a rabbi known as the Maharitz (Moreinu Ha-Rav Yiḥya Tzalaḥ), in an attempt to break the deadlock between the pre-existing followers of Maimonides and the new followers of the mystic, Isaac Luria. It substantially follows the older Yemenite tradition, with only a few concessions to the usages of the Ari. A Baladi Jew may or may not accept the Kabbalah theologically: if he does, he regards himself as following Luria's own advice that every Jew should follow his ancestral tradition.
 The Shami Jews (from Arabic ash-Sham, the north, referring to Greater Syria including Israel) represent those who accepted the Sephardic/Mizrahi rite and lines of rabbinic authority, after being exposed to new inexpensive, typeset siddurs (prayer books) brought from Israel and the Sephardic diaspora by envoys and merchants in the late 17th century and 18th century. The "local rabbinic leadership resisted the new versions....Nevertheless, the new prayer books were widely accepted." As part of that process, the Shami accepted the Zohar and modified their rites to accommodate the usages of the Ari to the maximum extent. The text of the Shami siddur now largely follows the Sephardic tradition, though the pronunciation, chant and customs are still Yemenite in flavour. They generally base their legal rulings both on the Rambam (Maimonides) and on the Shulchan Aruch (Code of Jewish Law). In their interpretation of Jewish law, Shami Yemenite Jews were strongly influenced by Syrian Sephardi Jews, though on some issues, they rejected the later European codes of Jewish law, and instead followed the earlier decisions of Maimonides. Most Yemenite Jews living today follow the Shami customs. The Shami rite was always more prevalent, even 50 years ago.
 The "Rambamists" are followers of, or to some extent influenced by, the Dor Daim movement, and are strict followers of Talmudic law as compiled by Maimonides, aka "Rambam". They are regarded as a subdivision of the Baladi Jews, and claim to preserve the Baladi tradition in its pure form. They generally reject the Zohar and Lurianic Kabbalah altogether. Many of them object to terms like "Rambamist". In their eyes, they are simply following the most ancient preservation of Torah, which (according to their research) was recorded in the Mishneh Torah.

School reform dispute (Dor Daim vs Iqshim)

Towards the end of the 19th century, new ideas began to reach Yemenite Jews from abroad. Hebrew newspapers began to arrive, and relations developed with Sephardic Jews, who came to Yemen from various Ottoman provinces to trade with the army and government officials.

Two Jewish travelers, Joseph Halévy, a French-trained Jewish Orientalist, and Eduard Glaser, an Austrian-Jewish astronomer and Arabist, in particular had a strong influence on a group of young Yemenite Jews, the most outstanding of whom was Rabbi Yiḥyah Qafiḥ. As a result of his contact with Halévy and Glaser, Qafiḥ introduced modern content into the educational system. Qafiḥ opened a new school and, in addition to traditional subjects, introduced arithmetic, Hebrew and Arabic, with the grammar of both languages. The curriculum also included subjects such as natural science, history, geography, astronomy, sports and Turkish.

The Dor Daim and Iqshim dispute about the Zohar literature broke out in 1912, inflamed Sana'a's Jewish community, and split it into two rival groups that maintained separate communal institutions until the late 1940s. Rabbi Qafiḥ and his friends were the leaders of a group of Maimonideans called Dor Daim (the "generation of knowledge"). Their goal was to bring Yemenite Jews back to the original Maimonidean method of understanding Judaism that existed in pre-17th-century Yemen.

Similar to certain Spanish and Portuguese Jews (Western Sephardi Jews), the Dor Daim rejected the Zohar, a book of esoteric mysticism. They felt that the Kabbalah which was based on the Zohar was irrational, alien, and inconsistent with the true reasonable nature of Judaism. In 1913, when it seemed that Rabbi Qafiḥ, then headmaster of the new Jewish school and working closely with the Ottoman authorities, enjoyed sufficient political support, the Dor Daim made its views public, and tried to convince the entire community to accept them. Many of the non-Dor Deah elements of the community rejected the Dor Deah concepts. The opposition, the Iqshim, headed by Rabbi Yiḥya Yiṣḥaq, the Hakham Bashi, refused to deviate from the accepted customs and from the study of the Zohar. One of the Iqshim's targets in the fight against Rabbi Qafiḥ was his modern Turkish-Jewish school. Due to the Dor Daim and Iqshim dispute, the school closed 5 years after it was opened, before the educational system could develop a reserve of young people who had been exposed to its ideas.

Education
Education of children was of paramount importance to Jewish fathers in Yemen, who, as a rule, sent their children from an early age to study the portions of the Torah, usually under the tutelage of a local teacher. Often, such teachings were conducted in the home of their teacher. It was not uncommon for the teacher to be occupied in his trade (coat maker, weaver, etc.) while instructing his students. All instruction consisted of the recital and memorization of sacred texts. The most astute of these students, when they came of age, pursued after a higher Jewish education and which almost always entailed studying Shechita (ritual slaughter), and receiving a license from a qualified instructor to slaughter domestic livestock.

Baladi-rite and Shami-rite prayer books

 Siaḥ Yerushalayim, Baladi prayer book in 4 vols, ed. Yosef Qafih
 Tefillat Avot, Baladi prayer book (6 vols.)
 Torat Avot, Baladi prayer book (7 vols.)
 Tiklal Ha-Mefoar (Maharitz) Nusaḥ Baladi, Meyusad Al Pi Ha-Tiklal Im Etz Ḥayim Ha-Shalem Arukh Ke-Minhag Yahaduth Teiman: Bene Berak: Or Neriyah ben Mosheh Ozeri: 2001 or 2002
 Siddur Tefillat HaḤodesh — Beit Yaakov (Nusaḥ Shami), Nusaḥ Sepharadim, Teiman, and the Edoth Mizraḥ
 Rabbi Shalom Sharabi, Siddur Kavanot HaRashash: Yeshivat HaChaim Ve'Hashalom
 Hatiklāl Hamevo'ar (Baladi-rite), ed. Pinḥas Qoraḥ, Benei Barak 2006

Yemenite rabbis

 Solomon Adeni (1567–1625)
 Yihye Bashiri (died 1661)
 Zechariah Dhahiri (c. 1531–1608)
 Hayyim Habshush (c. 1833–1899)
 Yihya Yitzhak Halevi (1867–1932)
 Avraham Al-Naddaf (1866–1940)
 Yosef Qafih (1917–2000)
 Yiḥyah Qafiḥ (1850–1931)
 Amram Qorah (1871–1952)
 Mordechai Sharabi (1908–1994)
 Maharitz (Yihya Salah) (1713–1805)
 Shalom Shabazi (1619–c. 1720)
 Uzi Meshulam (1952–2013)
 David ben Amram Adani (14th century)
 Nethanel ben Isaiah (14th century)
 Zechariah ha-Rofé (15th century)
 Natan'el al-Fayyumi (c. 1090–1165)
 Jacob ben Nathanael (12th century)
 Shalom Sharabi (1720–1777)

Yemenite Hebrew

Yemenite Hebrew has been studied by scholars, many of whom believe it to contain the most ancient phonetic and grammatical features. There are two main pronunciations of Yemenite Hebrew, considered by many scholars to be the most accurate modern-day form of Biblical Hebrew, although there are technically a total of five that relate to the regions of Yemen. In the Yemenite dialect, all Hebrew letters have a distinct sound, except for sāmeḵ and śîn, which are both pronounced . The Sanaani Hebrew pronunciation (used by the majority) has been indirectly critiqued by Saadia Gaon since it contains the Hebrew letters  and guf, which he rules is incorrect. There are Yemenite scholars, such as Rabbi Ratzon Arusi, who say that such a perspective is a misunderstanding of Saadia Gaon's words.

While Jewish boys learned Hebrew from the age of 3, it was used primarily as a liturgical and scholarly language. In daily life, Yemenite Jews spoke in regional Judeo-Arabic.

Yemenite Jewish literature

The oldest Yemenite manuscripts are those of the Hebrew Bible, which the Yemenite Jews call "Taj" ("crown"). The oldest texts dating from the 9th century, and each of them has a short Masoretic introduction, while many contain Arabic commentaries.

Yemenite Jews were acquainted with the works of Saadia Gaon, Rashi, Kimhi, Nahmanides, Yehudah ha Levy and Isaac Arama, besides producing a number of exegetes from among themselves. In the 14th century, Nathanael ben Isaiah wrote an Arabic commentary on the Bible; in the second half of the 15th century, Saadia ben David al-Adeni was the author of a commentary on Leviticus, Numbers, and Deuteronomy. Abraham ben Solomon wrote on the Prophets.

Among the midrash collections from Yemen mention should be made of the Midrash ha-Gadol of David bar Amram al-Adeni. Between 1413 and 1430 the physician Yaḥya Zechariah b. Solomon wrote a compilation entitled "Midrash ha-Ḥefeẓ," which included the Pentateuch, Lamentations, Book of Esther, and other sections of the Hebrew Bible. Between 1484 and 1493 David al-Lawani composed his "Midrash al-Wajiz al-Mughni." The earliest complete Judeo-Arabic copy of Maimonides' Guide for the Perplexed, copied in Yemen in 1380, was found in the India Office Library and added to the collection of the British Library in 1992.

Among the Yemenite poets who wrote Hebrew and Arabic hymns modeled after the Spanish school, mention may be made of Zechariah (Yaḥya) al-Dhahiri and the members of the Shabazi family. Al-Dhahiri's work, which makes use of the poetic genre known as maqāmah, a style inspired by Ḥariri, was written in 1573 under the title Sefer ha-Musar. Herein, the author describes in 45 chapters his travels throughout India, Iraq, Turkey, Syria, the Land of Israel and Egypt, including a description of Rabbi Yosef Karo's seat of learning in Safed. The philosophical writers include: Saadia b. Jabeẓ and Saadia b. Mas'ud, both at the beginning of the 14th century; Ibn al-Ḥawas, the author of a treatise in the form of a dialogue written in rhymed prose, and termed by its author the "Flower of Yemen"; Ḥasan al-Dhamari; and Joseph ha-Levi b. Jefes, who wrote the philosophical treatises "Ner Yisrael" (1420) and "Kitab al-Masaḥah."

Traditional Jewish attire

Men's clothing

A Tunic and habit, the latter made with a central hat, were the traditional items of clothing worn by a married Jewish man in Yemen. Leading rabbinic scholar and sage, Rabbi Yosef Qafih, described the manner in which they would wrap their habits, saying that the habit was sometimes worn while wrapped around a man's head, or simply partly draped over his head. German ethnographer Erich Brauer (1895–1942) described the differences between Jewish and Gentile garb, making note of the fact that the differences existed only in their outer garments, but not in their undergarments. He also offered the following description:

As noted, some of the men's dress-codes were forced upon them by laws of the State. For example, formerly in Yemen, Jews were not allowed to wear clothing of any color besides blue. Earlier, in Jacob Saphir's time (1859), they'd wear outer garments that were "utterly black." When German-Danish explorer, Carsten Niebuhr, visited Yemen in 1763, the only person he saw wearing the blue-colored tunic was the Jewish courtier, the Minister and Prince, Sālim b. Aharon Irāqi Ha-Kohen, who served under two kings for a period of no less than twenty-eight years.

The traditional Yemenite tallīt is a full-length tallīt made from fine wool or goat's hair of a single black or brown color, called šämläh, but it was not unique unto Jews alone. Muslims would also wear similar items of covering, to protect them from the heat or rain. Jewish garments, however, bore the ritual fringes prescribed for such garments. The wearing of such garments was not unique to prayer time alone, but was worn the entire day. Later, decorative black and white striped shawls were imported into the country from Europe, and which were highly valued by the Jews of Yemen who wore them on special occasions and on the Sabbath day. The small tallīt (ṭallīt kaṭan) was introduced into Yemen via Aden from European centers, and principally worn by rabbis and educated persons.

Women's clothing

Jewish women in Yemen traditionally wore branched pantaloons beneath their long black tunics. The pantaloons were usually made of a jet-black color, tapering close to their ankles, and decorated at the lower seams with a fine embroidered stitch of silver. The tunic served as, both, a dress and long-sleeved blouse, all in one piece. In addition, all young girls wore a black, conical shaped hat upon their heads, which took the place of a scarf. These hats were called in the local vernacular, gargush, and were also decorated with an embroidered sash about its borders, besides being equipped with tapering flaps that extended down to the ears and to the nape of the neck. Older women in Sana'a would wear a broad veil-like scarf over their heads, called maswan, especially when going out in public places, and which was traditionally worn above the closer fitting scarves that covered their hair. All women were adorned with black slippers when walking in public places, and only very small girls would walk barefoot.

Jewish women and girls in Haydan a-sham (in the far northern districts of Yemen) did not make use of the gargush, but would wear a black scarf tied firmly to their foreheads, resembling a black band, along with the covering made by an additional scarf that covered the hair.

Culinary specialties
The Yemenite Jews are known for bringing to Israel certain culinary dishes, now popularly eaten by all ethnic-groups living in Israel, namely, the malawach (itself an adaptation of the Yemeni mulawah), and jachnun. Lesser-known breadstuffs include the kubaneh (a traditional Sabbath bread), luḥūḥ, sabayah, and zalabiyeh.

Genetics

DNA testing between Yemenite Jews and members of the world's other various Jewish communities shows a common link, with most communities sharing similar paternal genetic profiles. Furthermore, the Y chromosome signatures of the Yemenite Jews are also similar to those of other Middle Eastern populations. Recent studies of Yemeni Mitochondrial DNA, indicate the presence of a high frequency of sub-Saharan African L haplogroups. This notable African contribution is lacking in other Jewish diaspora populations, but it does not exclude, in fact it may reflect, potential descent from exiled ancient Israelite individuals who had a shared African and Middle Eastern ancestry. There is no genetic evidence for the large-scale conversion of local Yemenis.

The vast majority of Middle Eastern Jewish communities are descended from the earliest Assyrian (late 8th Century BCE) and Babylonian (6th Century BCE) Hebrew exiles, whose mtDNA pools virtually lack sub-Saharan L and North and East African-specific M1 and U6 mtDNA variants. Secondly, the Ashkenazi and North African Jews with a low, but still detectable share of L lineages with very low diversity. This low diversity is most easily explained by a limited number of unique Hg L(xM,N) founders. The third example brings together Ethiopian and Yemenite Jews, rich in Hg L(xM,N) and Hg M1 (in particular in Ethiopian Jews) (Tables S1 and Table S3). As far as Ethiopian and Yemenite Jews are concerned, the main observation here is not in the absolute frequency of Hg L(xM,N) among them, but rather its high diversity, in particular among Beta Israel (Tables S1 and Table S3). Furthermore, samples of Ethiopian and Yemenite Jewish mtDNA pools differ considerably in relative abundance of typically West Asian mtDNA lineages such as derivatives of HV1, JT and others (Tables S1 and Table S3), virtually absent in the former...Maternal DNA of Mizrachi Jews is varied, even slightly from other Mizrachim, indicating likely majority Israelite and some non-Israelite origin from among the women of each of the Near Eastern populations; e.g. Yemeni, Mesopotamian, and other local Near Eastern women. DNA markings, however, are irrelevant when considering that, in Jewish law, proselytes who may have joined the religion of Israel and married into Israelite families, will still pass on their DNA readings to their children. According to Simon Schama,  the Israeli geneticist Batsheva Bonne-Tamir established that the ancestry of Yemeni Jews goes back to south-Western Arabian and Bedouin conversions.

The Y chromosome data on Yemenite Jews show greater evidence of shared Jewish ancestry. In particular, four Y haplogroups (A3b2, E3b3a, E3b1, and J2e) are shared between Yemenite and the Ethiopian Jewish population, whereas no exact mitochondrial haplotypes are shared between these two populations. Additionally, four Yemenite Jewish Y haplogroups (E3b1, E3b1b, J1, and R1b10) are also shared with other Jewish populations (including Ashkenazi, Iraqi, Libyan, and Moroccan Jews), as well as Druze and Palestinians. This paternal similarity across Jewish populations is consistent with the theory that most Jewish Diaspora populations share more paternal ancestry than maternal ancestry (Thomas et al., 2002). In sum, neither Yemenite Jewish mtDNA nor Y (chromosome) data support the origin theory of large-scale conversions of Yemeni Arabs to Judaism during the fifth to sixth centuries, based on minimal contribution from the neighboring non-Jewish Yemeni population. In contrast, molecular genetic data support descent from ancient Israeli exiles due to haplotypes shared with other Jewish populations (as seen in the Y chromosome) in addition to shared East African and more generalized Middle Eastern ancestry (supported by both mtDNA and Y).

In medicine, the mutation SAMD9 (sterile alpha motif domain containing 9), which encodes a protein involved in the regulation of extraosseous calcification, has been found to underlie normophosphatemic familial tumoral calcinosis in families of Jewish Yemenite origin.

Immigration to Israel

Places of origin and 1881-1939 new communities
The three major population centers for Jews in southern Arabia were Aden, Habban, and the Hadhramaut. The Jews of Aden lived in and around the city, and flourished during the British Aden Protectorate.

The vast majority of Yemenite immigrants counted by the authorities of Mandate Palestine in 1939 had settled in the country prior to that date. Throughout the periods of Ottoman Palestine and Mandatory Palestine, Jews from Yemen had settled primarily in agricultural settlements in the country, namely: Petach Tikvah (Machaneh Yehuda), Rishon Lezion (Shivat Zion), Rehovot (Sha'arayim and Marmorek), Wadi Chanin (later called Ness Ziona), Beer Yaakov, Hadera (Nachliel), Zichron Yaakov, Yavne'el, Gedera, Ben Shemen, Kinneret, Degania and Milhamia. Others chose to live in the urban areas of Jerusalem (Silwan, and Nachalat Zvi), Jaffa, Tel Aviv (Kerem Hateimanim), and later, Netanya (Shekhunat Zvi).

First wave of emigration: 1881 to 1918
Emigration from Yemen to the area now known as Israel began in 1881, and continued almost without interruption until 1914. It was during this time that about 10% of the Yemenite Jews left. Due to the changes in the Ottoman Empire, citizens could move more freely, and in 1869, travel was improved with the opening of the Suez Canal, which reduced the travel time from Yemen to Palestine. Certain Yemenite Jews interpreted these changes and the new developments in the "Holy Land" as heavenly signs that the time of redemption was near. By settling in the Holy Land, they would play a part in what they believed could precipitate the anticipated messianic era.

From 1881 to 1882, some 30 Jewish families left Sana'a and several nearby settlements, and made the long trek by foot and by sea to Jerusalem, where most had settled in Silwan. This wave was followed by other Jews from central Yemen, who continued to move into Palestine until 1914. The majority of these groups would later move into Jerusalem proper and Jaffa. Rabbi Avraham Al-Naddaf, who migrated to Jerusalem in 1891, described in his autobiography the hardships the Yemenite Jewish community faced in their new country, where there were no hostelries to accommodate wayfarers and new immigrants. On the other hand, he writes that the Sephardi kollelim (seminaries) had taken under their auspices the Yemenite Jews from the moment they set foot in Jerusalem. Later, however, the Yemenites would come to feel discriminated against by the Sephardic community, who compelled them to no longer make use of their own soft, pliable matzah, but to buy from them only the hard cracker-like matzah made weeks in advance prior to Passover. He also mentions that the Yemenite community would pay the prescribed tax to the public coffers; yet, they were not being allotted an equal share or subsidy as had been given to the Sephardic Jews. By 1910, the Yemenites had broken away from the Sephardic seminaries.

Before World War I, there was another wave that began in 1906 and continued until 1914. Hundreds of Yemenite Jews made their way to the Holy Land, and chose to settle in the agricultural settlements. It was after these movements that the World Zionist Organization sent Shmuel Yavne'eli to Yemen to encourage Jews to emigrate to Palestine. Yavne'eli reached Yemen at the beginning of 1911, and returned in April 1912. Due to Yavne'eli's efforts, about 1,000 Jews left central and southern Yemen, with several hundred more arriving before 1914. The purpose of this immigration was considered by the Zionist Office as allowing the importation of cheap labour. This wave of Yemenite Jewry underwent extreme suffering, physically and mentally, and those who arrived between 1912 and 1918 had a very high incidence of premature mortality, ranging from between 30% and 40% generally and, in some townships, reaching as high as 50%.

Second wave of emigration: 1920 to 1950

During the British Mandate of Palestine, the total number of persons registered as immigrants from Yemen, between the years April 1939–December 1945, was put at 4,554. By 1947, there were an estimated 35,000 Yemenite Jews living in Mandate Palestine. The largest bulk of immigration to Israel, however, came after the declaration of the state. Israel initiated Operation Magic Carpet in June 1949 and airlifted most of Yemen's Jews to Israel by September 1950.

In 1947, after the partition vote of the British Mandate of Palestine, Arab Muslim rioters, assisted by the local police force, engaged in a pogrom in Aden that killed 82 Jews and destroyed hundreds of Jewish homes. Aden's Jewish community was economically paralyzed, as most of the Jewish stores and businesses were destroyed. Early in 1948, the unfounded rumour of the ritual murder of two girls led to looting.

This increasingly perilous situation led to the emigration of virtually the entire Yemenite Jewish community between June 1949 and September 1950 in Operation Magic Carpet. During this period, over 50,000 Jews migrated to Israel.
Operation Magic Carpet (Yemen) began in June 1949 and ended in September 1950. Part of the operation happened during the 1947–48 Civil War in Mandatory Palestine and the 1948 Arab–Israeli War (May 15, 1948 – March 10, 1949). The operation was planned by the American Jewish Joint Distribution Committee. The plan was for the Jews from all over Yemen to make their way to the Aden area. Specifically, the Jews were to arrive in Hashed Camp and live there until they could be airlifted to Israel. Hashed was an old British military camp in the desert, about a mile away from the city of Sheikh Othman. The operation took longer than was originally planned. Over the course of the operation, hundreds of migrants died in Hashed Camp, as well as on the plane rides to Israel. By September 1950, almost 50,000 Jews had been successfully airlifted to the newly formed state of Israel.

A smaller, continuous migration was allowed to continue into 1962, when a civil war put an abrupt halt to any further Jewish exodus.

According to an official statement by Alaska Airlines:

In the wake of the 1948 Arab Israeli War when vast territories were added to the State of Israel, the Jewish Agency under the good offices of Levi Eshkol, then head of the Settlement Department in that Agency, decided to settle many of the new immigrants arriving in Israel in newly founded agricultural communities. The idea was given further impetus when Yosef Weitz of the Jewish National Fund proposed settling many of the country's new immigrants upon agricultural farms built in the recently acquired territories: in the mountainous regions, in Galilee and in the Jerusalem Corridor, places heretofore sparsely settled. It was decided that these new immigrants, many of whom were Yemenites, would make their livelihood by preparing the land for cultivation and planting trees. The first stage of this plan was to call such places "work villages," later to be converted into "cooperative farms" (moshavim). In this manner were established Eshtaol, Yish'i, Ajjur, Dayraban Gimel, Allar Aleph, Allar-Bet, Kesalon, among other places, although the majority of these frontier places were later abandoned by the new immigrants from Yemen for more urban places in central Israel. This prompted Levi Eshkol to write in a letter to Prime-Minister Ben-Gurion (dated 10 April 1950): "The Yemenite vision doesn't allow him to see what he can do in a place of boulders and rocks. He cannot imagine such a development as Neve Ilan which sits upon dry rock. Instead, he imagines that he is being deprived..." Many Yemenite Jews became irreligious through the re-education program of the Jewish Agency.

Third wave of emigration: 1990 to 2016

A third wave of emigration from Yemen began in the late 20th-century, with the intercession of Human Rights activist and professor, Hayim Tawil, founder of the International Coalition for the Revival of the Jews of Yemen (ICROJOY) in 1988. Tawil was instrumental in bringing out from Yemen the first Jew to emigrate in 23 years, and who set foot in Israel in September 1990. He was followed by other families in 1992, with the greatest bulk of Jewish families arriving in Israel between 1993 and 1994. These new Yemenite Jewish immigrants settled mainly in Rehovot (Oshiyot), Ashkelon and Beer-Sheva. Other families arrived in 1995 and 1996.

Orphan's decree (Yemen, 1922)
In 1922, the government of Yemen, under Yahya Muhammad Hamid ed-Din, re-introduced an ancient Islamic law entitled the "orphans decree". The law dictated that if Jewish boys or girls under the age of 12 were orphaned, they were to be forcibly converted to Islam, their connections to their families and communities were to be severed, and they had to be handed over to Muslim foster families. The rule was based on the law that the prophet Muhammad is "the father of the orphans", and on the fact that the Jews in Yemen were considered "under protection", and the ruler was obligated to care for them. The Jews tried to prevent the conversion of orphans in two main ways, which were by marrying them so the authorities would consider them as adults, or by smuggling them out of the country.

A prominent example is Abdul Rahman al-Iryani, the former president of the Yemen Arab Republic, who was alleged to be of Jewish descent by Dorit Mizrahi, a writer in the Israeli ultra-Orthodox weekly Mishpaha, who claimed he was her maternal uncle. According to her recollection of events, he was born Zekharia Hadad in 1910 to a Yemenite Jewish family in Ibb. He lost his parents in a major disease epidemic at the age of 8 and together with his 5-year-old sister, he was forcibly converted to Islam and they were put under the care of separate foster families. He was raised in the powerful al-Iryani family and adopted an Islamic name. Al-Iryani would later serve as minister of religious endowments under northern Yemen's first national government and he became the only civilian to have led northern Yemen.

Missing children (Israel, 1949-51)

Claims were made that, between 1949 and 1951, up to 1,033 children of Yemenite immigrant families may have disappeared from the immigrant camps. It was said that the parents were told that their children were ill and required hospitalization. Upon later visiting the hospital, it is claimed that the parents were told that their children had died though no bodies were presented and graves which have later proven to be empty in many cases were shown to the parents. Those who believed the theory contended that the Israeli government as well as other organizations in Israel kidnapped the children and gave them for adoption to other, non-Yemenite, families.

In 2001 a seven-year public inquiry commission concluded that the accusations that Yemenite children were kidnapped by the government are not true. The commission unequivocally rejected claims of a plot to take children away from Yemenite immigrants. The report determined that documentation existed showing that 972 of the 1,033 missing children were deceased. Five additional missing babies were found to be alive. The commission was unable to discover what happened in another 56 cases. With regard to these unresolved 56 cases, the commission deemed it "possible" that the children were handed over for adoption following decisions made by individual local social workers, but not as part of an official policy. In 2016, 400,000 documents were released in regard to the Yemenite Jewish Children affair.

Present situation

Today, the overwhelming majority of Yemenite Jews live in Israel.

Some Yemenite Jews stayed behind during Operation Magic Carpet, many of them not wanting to leave sick or elderly relatives behind. Another wave of emigration took place in 1959, with some 3,000 Yemenite Jews moving to Israel, and some others moving to the United States and United Kingdom. Those Jews that remained behind were forbidden from emigrating and were banned from contacting relatives abroad. They were isolated and scattered throughout the mountainous regions of northern Yemen, and suffered shortages of food, clothing, and medicine, and lacked religious articles. As a result, some converted to Islam. Their existence was unknown until 1976 when an American diplomat stumbled across a small Jewish community in a remote region of northern Yemen. For a short time afterward, Jewish organizations were allowed to travel openly in Yemen, distributing Hebrew books and materials. From August 1992 to July 17, 1993, Jews numbering some 246 persons moved to Israel from Yemen, via Germany, and some via the United States.

A small Jewish community existed in the town of Bayt Harash (2 km away from Raydah). They had a rabbi, a functioning synagogue, and a mikveh. They also had a boys yeshiva and a girls seminary, funded by a Satmar-affiliated Hasidic organization in Monsey, New York, US. The town hosted a yeshiva, also funded by a Satmar-affiliated organization.

In spite of hostile conditions in recent years for Jews still living in Yemen, Yemeni security forces have gone to great lengths to try to convince the Jews to stay in their towns. These attempts, however, failed, and the authorities were forced to provide financial aid for the Jews so they would be able to rent accommodations in safer areas.

Despite an official ban on emigration, many Yemenite Jews emigrated to Israel, the United States, and the United Kingdom in the 2000s, fleeing anti-Semitic persecution and seeking better Jewish marriage prospects. Many of them had initially gone there to study but had never returned. There was essentially no Jewish population in Sanaʽa until the Shia insurgency broke out in northern Yemen in 2004. In 2006 it was reported that a Jewish woman in Yemen who had spurned a Muslim suitor had not only been kidnapped and forced to marry him, but had been forced to convert to Islam as well. The Houthis directly threatened the Jewish community in 2007, prompting the government of President Saleh to offer them refuge in Sanaʽa. , around 700 Jews were living in the capital under government protection.

In December 2008, Moshe Ya'ish al-Nahari, a 30-year-old Hebrew teacher and kosher butcher from Raydah, was shot and killed by Abed el-Aziz el-Abadi, a former MiG-29 pilot in the Yemeni Air Force. Abadi confronted Nahari in the Raydah market, and shouted out, "Jew, accept the message of Islam", and opened fire with an AK-47. Nahari was shot five times and died. During interrogation, Abadi proudly confessed his crime, and stated that "these Jews must convert to Islam". Abadi had murdered his wife two years before but had avoided prison by paying her family compensation. The court found Abadi mentally unstable, and ordered him to pay only a fine, but an appeals court sentenced him to death. Following al-Nahari's murder, the Jewish community expressed its feelings of insecurity, claiming to have received hate mail and threats by phone from Islamic extremists. Dozens of Jews reported receiving death threats and said that they had been subjected to violent harassment. Nahari's killing and continual anti-Semitic harassment prompted approximately 20 other Jewish residents of Raydah to emigrate to Israel. In 2009, five of Nahari's children moved to Israel, and in 2012, his wife and four other children followed, having initially stayed in Yemen so she could serve as a witness in Abadi's trial.

In February 2009, 10 Yemeni Jews migrated to Israel, and in July 2009, three families, or 16 people in total, followed suit. On October 31, 2009, the Wall Street Journal reported that in June 2009, an estimated 350 Jews were left in Yemen, and by October 2009, 60 had emigrated to the United States, and 100 were considering following suit. The BBC estimated that the community numbered 370 and was dwindling. In 2010, it was reported that 200 Yemeni Jews would be allowed to immigrate to the United Kingdom.

In August 2012, Aharon Zindani, a Jewish community leader from Sana'a, was stabbed to death in a market in an anti-Semitic attack. Subsequently, his wife and five children emigrated to Israel, and took his body with them for burial in Israel, with assistance from the Jewish Agency and the Israeli Foreign Ministry.

In January 2013, it was reported that a group of 60 Yemenite Jews had migrated to Israel in a secret operation, arriving in Israel via a flight from Qatar. This was reported to be part of a larger operation which was being carried out in order to bring the approximately 400 Jews left in Yemen to Israel in the coming months.

In April 2014 it was reported that the remaining Jewish Population in Yemen numbered 90.

On October 11, 2015, Likud MK Ayoob Kara stated that members of the Yemenite Jewish community had contacted him to say that the Houthi-led Yemen government had given them an ultimatum to convert or leave the country. A spokesman for the party of former President Ali Abdullah Saleh denied the reports as incorrect.

On March 21, 2016, a group of 19 Yemenite Jews were flown to Israel in a secret operation, leaving the population at about 50. In April 2016 the Houthis arrested three Yemenite Jews-including Rabbi Yousef. On June 7, 2016 Jews who had been arrested in Yemen after having helped to smuggle out a Torah scroll were released.

In May 2017 the Yemeni-based charity Mona Relief (Yemen Organization for Humanitarian Relief and Development) gave aid to 86 members of the Jewish community in Sana'a.

In a July 2018 interview with a Yemenite rabbi, he claimed that they were definitely treated very well before the recent war in Yemen which has affected all communities in Yemen. He has also said that Yemenite Jews should have never traveled away from Yemen and that he believes thousands of Yemenite Jews will return to Yemen after the war ends.

In 2019, the Mona Relief website reported (February 25): "Mona Relief's team in the capital Sana'a delivered today monthly food aid packages to Jewish minority families in Yemen. Mona Relief has been delivering food aid baskets to Jewish community in the capital Sana'a since 2016. Our project today was funded by Mona Relief's online fundraising campaign in indiegog ..."

As of March 2020, the Jewish Cemetery in Aden was destroyed. On April 28, 2020, Yemenite Minister Moammer al-Iryani remarked the fate of the last 50 Jews in Yemen is unknown.

A 2020 World Population Review with a Census of Jewish population by country has no listing of any Jews in Yemen.

On July 13, 2020, it was reported that the Houthi Militia were capturing the last Jews of Yemen of the Kharif District. In their last mention of the Jews in Yemen in July 2020 the Mona Relief reported on their Website that as of July 19, 2020, of the Jewish Population in Yemen there were only a "handful" of Jews in Sana'a.

According to Yemeni publications published in July 2020, the last two Jewish families were waiting for deportation from the areas controlled by the Houthis, which would make Yemen, for the first time in its modern history, devoid of Jews, with the exception of the families of the brothers Suleiman Musa Salem and Sulaiman Yahya Habib in Sana’a and the family of Salem Musa Mara’bi who moved to the complex owned by the Ministry of Defense near the U.S. embassy in 2007 after the Houthis assaulted them and looted their homes. The publications said that a Jewish woman lives with her brother in the Rayda district and a man and his wife live in the Arhab district of the Sana’a governorate. A source said, “It is now clear that the Houthis want to deport the rest of the Jews, and prevent them from selling their properties at their real prices, and we are surprised that the international community and local and international human rights organizations have remained silent towards the process of forced deportation and forcing the Jews to leave their country and prevent them from disposing of their property.

In August 2020 of an estimated 100 or so remaining Yemen Jews, 42 have migrated to U.A.E. and the rest would also leave.

On November 10, 2020, the U.S. State Department called for the immediate and unconditional release of Levi Salem Musa Marhabi. A press statement said Marhabi has been wrongfully detained by the Houthi  militia for four years, despite a court ordering his release in September 2019. On November 25, 2020, it is reported that a total of 38 Jews still remain in Yemen.

In December 2020 an Israeli Rabbi visited the Yemenite Jews who escaped to the UAE. As of January 12, 2021, 7 Jews have left Yemen for UAE leaving 31 Jews in Yemen.

On 28 March 2021, 13 Jews were forced by the Houthis to leave Yemen, The Jerusalem Post reported that the remaining Jewish population in Yemen consists of four elderly Jews in Yemen ending the continuous presence of a community that dated back to antiquity. According to one report there are six Jews left in Yemen: one woman; her brother; 3 others, and Levi Salem Marhabi (who has been imprisoned for helping smuggle a Torah scroll out of Yemen). In December 2021 the Jews of Yemen received  Hanukkah kits. In March 2022 the United Nations reports there is just 1 Jew in Yemen (Levi Salem Marhabi).

Yemenite Jewish surnames
The subject of Jewish surnames in Yemen is a complex one. Most surnames are gentilic or toponymic surnames, meaning, they are derived from the name of an ancestor's place of residence (the name of a town or village, such as Gadasi from al-Gades; Qa'taby from Qa'tabah; Manqadi from Manqadah; Damari from Dhamar, Damti from Damt, etc.), while fewer are eponymous or patronymic surnames, being derived from the name of an ancient ancestor. Some surnames reflect an ancestor's profession. In some cases, surnames are derived from a certain physical characteristic of one's distant ancestor. Some families bear original Spanish surnames, such as Medina and Giyyat. Some names went through additional changes upon emigration to Israel. For example, some who formerly bore the surname of Radha have changed their surname to Ratzon, the Hebrew being the direct translation of the word's meaning in Arabic, while yet others have simply changed their names to a more Hebraicized sound, such as the surnames of Al-Nadaf (lit. a stuffer of cushions; carder of cotton), which was later changed to Nadav ("generous"), and 'Urqabi (so-named from a locality in Yemen) which was later changed to Argov; or Sheḥib, meaning "one whose voice is hoarse," which was changed to Shevach, meaning "praise," by a reversal of the last two letters.

Notable Israeli soldiers of Yemenite descent
 Avigdor Kahalani
 David Maimon

Yemenite Jews and Israeli culture

Traditional culture
Israeli Yemenite Jews were initially discouraged from practicing their culture by the dominant Ashkenazi majority, and the practice of using henna before weddings declined. Beginning around the late 1970s, discussions were held in honor of the ethnic heritage of Yemenite Jews and by 2018, a revival of some Yemenite customs occurred. The cathartic moment was an exhibition of a Yemeni bride which was shown at the Israel Museum in 1965.

Music
Yemeni Jews are predominant among Israeli performers of Oriental music. Yemenite singer Shoshana Damari is considered "The queen of Israeli music", and 2 of the most successful Israeli singers abroad, Ofra Haza and Achinoam Nini (Noa), are of Yemenite origin. At the Eurovision Song Contest, 1998, 1979, and 1978 winners Dana International, Gali Atari, and Izhar Cohen, 1983 runner-up Ofra Haza, and 2008 top 10 finalist Boaz Mauda, are Yemenite Jews. Harel Skaat, who competed at Oslo in 2010, is the son of a Yemenite Jewish father. Other Israeli singers and musicians of Yemenite Jewish descent include Zohar Argov, the three sisters of the music group A-WA (Yemenite Jewish father), Inbar Bakal, Mosh Ben-Ari, Yosefa Dahari, Daklon, Eyal Golan, Zion Golan, Yishai Levi, Sara Levi-Tanai (choreographer and songwriter), Bo'az Ma'uda, Avihu Medina, Boaz Sharabi, Pe'er Tasi, Shimi Tavori, Margalit Tzan'ani, and Tomer Yosef of Balkan Beat Box.

Politics

Israeli Politicians of Yemenite Jewish descent include Gila Gamliel (current member of the Knesset for Likud), Meir Yitzhak Halevi (the Mayor of Eilat), Saadia Kobashi (leader of the Yemenite Jewish community in Israel, and one of the signatories of the country's declaration of independence), and Avraham Taviv.

Sports and media
Becky Griffin, whose mother is Yemenite Jewish, works as a model, TV presenter and actress. Shahar Tzuberi is an Olympic windsurfer.

Linoy Ashram is an Israeli individual rhythmic gymnast. She is the 2020 Olympic All-around Champion.

Further reading
 Idelsohn, Abraham Z. (1914). Thesaurus of Hebrew–Oriental Melodies, vol. 1 (Songs of the Yemenite Jews), by Abraham Z. Idelsohn, Leipzig
 Qafih, Yosef (1982). Halikhot Teiman — The Life of Jews of Sana'a, Ben-Zvi Institute: Jerusalem (in Hebrew)
 Qorah, Amram (1988). Sa‘arat Teiman, Jerusalem (in Hebrew)
 
 Megillah (tractate) (The Yemenite MS. of Megillah in the Library of Columbia University)
 Parfitt, Tudor (1996) The Road to Redemption: The Jews of the Yemen 1900–1950. Brill's Series in Jewish Studies vol. XVII. Leiden: Brill.
 Rohrbacher, Peter (2006). „Wüstenwanderer“ gegen „Wolkenpolitiker“ – Die Pressefehde zwischen Eduard Glaser und Theodor Herzl in: Anzeiger der philosophisch-historischen Klasse; 141. Wien: Österreichische Akademie der Wissenschaften, pp. 103–116.
 Simon, Reeva; Laskier, Michael; Reguer, Sara (eds.) (2002). The Jews of the Middle East and North Africa In Modern Times, Columbia University Press, s.v. Chapters 8 and 21

 Verskin, Alan (2018). A Vision of Yemen: The Travels of a European Orientalist and His Native Guide. A Translation of Hayyim Habshush's Travelogue. Stanford, CA. Stanford University Press

See also

 Torah scroll (Yemenite)
 Hadhrami Jews
 Habbani Jews
 Adeni Jews
 Arab Jews
 Shara'bi Jews
 Israelites
 Groups claiming affiliation with Israelites
 Ten Lost Tribes
 History of the Jews in the Arabian Peninsula
 The Jewish community of Saada
 Israel–Yemen relations
 History of the Jews under Muslim rule
 Antisemitism in Islam
 Antisemitism in the Arab world
 Racism in the Arab world
 Islamic–Jewish relations
 Jewish exodus from the Muslim world
 Kfar Tapuach (Apple-village), an Orthodox Jewish Israeli settlement which is located in the west Bank and was founded by Yemenite Jews in 1978
 Lemba people, a Bantu speaking ethnic group which is partially descended from Yemenite Jews and is native to Zimbabwe and South Africa, with smaller branches in Mozambique and Malawi
 List of Jews from the Arab World
 Mizrahi Jews
 Yemenite citron
 Yemenite Hebrew
 Yemenite Jewish poetry
 Yemenite Jewish silversmiths
 Mawza Exile
 Midrash HaGadol
 Nathan ben Abraham I
 Yemenite Children Affair
 Orphans' Decree
 Baladi-rite prayer
 Epistle to Yemen
 Al-Ousta Codex

References

Bibliography

External links

 Jews of Yemen Jewish Encyclopedia, 1906
 History of the Jews of Yemen Rabbi Menachem Levine, Aish.com
 Yihye Haybi's Collection, now at the Israel Museum
 Geniza Project, the Nahum Collection
 Television Documentary of Yemen's Jewish Community in 1929 (in Arabic), filmed in Sana'a by Russian film director, Vladimir Shnejderov
 Yemenite Jews and Antiquity
Yemen's LAst Jews March 2015 
Yemen loses the Last of its Jews to Israel (Arab Weekly March 2016)
Yet News
Yefet Shlomo Collection (in Hebrew)  on the Digital collections of Younes and Soraya Nazarian Library, University of Haifa

 
 
Jewish ethnic groups
History of the Jews in the Middle East
Mizrahi Jews
Ethnic groups in Israel
Ethnic groups in the Middle East
Jewish culture
Religion in Yemen